"The Cisco Kid" is a song performed by War, and written by Thomas Allen, Harold Brown, Morris "BB" Dickerson, Charles Miller, Howard Scott, Lee Oskar and Lonnie Jordan, all members of War at the time. It is the first song on their 1972 album The World Is a Ghetto, and is the group's highest-charting song on the Billboard Hot 100, peaking at number two.

Song description
The song describes the adventures of Cisco and Pancho, two cowboys from the 1950s TV program The Cisco Kid. The song is known for having a different sequence of notes following each line. A distinct four-note phrase played by saxophone, harmonica, and flute punctuates the end of the first few lines, while a brief jam from the rhythm section follows the next couple. A completely different four-note phrase (this time played by guitar) follows some of the later lyrics, as well as lines of dialogue from the television show---and a three-note sequence repeated twice in a row is played by the harmonica and saxophone. These easy-to-remember hooks, along with the funk-driven rhythm section, make this song one of War's signature tunes, and the "most fun," according to lead vocalist and guitarist Scott.

Chart performance
In the US, "The Cisco Kid" reached No. 2 on the Billboard Hot 100 for two weeks at the end of April and start of May 1973, kept out of #1 by "Tie a Yellow Ribbon Round the Ole Oak Tree" by "Tony Orlando and Dawn" On the US R&B singles chart, it peaked at No. 5. It reached No. 1 in Canada on the RPM 100 singles chart. It was certified gold.

Charts

Certifications

References

External links

War (American band) songs
Cisco Kid
Songs about friendship
1972 songs
1972 singles
1973 singles
United Artists Records singles
RPM Top Singles number-one singles